Co-Redemptrix (also spelled Coredemptrix; Co-Redemptress is an equivalent term) is a title used by some Catholics for the Blessed Virgin Mary, and refers to Mary's role in the redemption of all peoples. 

According to those who use the term, Co-Redemptrix refers to a subordinate but essential participation by the Blessed Virgin Mary in redemption, notably that she gave free consent to give life to the Redeemer, which meant sharing his life, suffering, and death, which were redemptive for the world. Related to this belief is the concept of Mary as Mediatrix, which is a separate concept but regularly included by Catholics who use the title Co-Redemptrix. Some, in particular the adherents of the Amsterdam visions, have petitioned for a dogmatic definition, along with Mediatrix.

The concept was especially common in the late Middle Ages, when it was promoted heavily among the Franciscans, and often resisted by the Dominicans.  By the early 16th century the hopes of the concept becoming Catholic doctrine had receded, and have never seriously revived.  In more recent times, the title has received some support from the Catholic Magisterium though it is not included in the concluding chapter of the apostolic constitution Lumen gentium of the Second Vatican Council, which chapter many theologians hold to be a comprehensive summary of Roman Catholic Mariology. As a Cardinal, Pope Benedict XVI suggested that the Marian title caused confusion and did not sufficiently reflect scripture. Pope Francis has repeatedly suggested the title should not be used.

History
As early as the year 200, the Church Father Irenaeus referred to Mary as the cause of our salvation given her fiat ("let it be").
  

The concept was especially common in the late Middle Ages, when it was promoted heavily among the Franciscans, and often resisted by the Dominicans. It is an idea which was the subject of considerable theological debate, reaching a peak in the 15th century. By the early 16th century the hopes of the concept becoming Catholic doctrine had receded, and have never seriously revived.

A number of theologians have discussed the concept over the years, from the 19th-century Father Frederick William Faber, to the 20th-century Mariologist Father Gabriel Roschini. The term Co-Redemptress was used by Pope Leo XIII in 1894. "For in the Rosary all the part that Mary took as our co-Redemptress comes to us..." In his 1946 publication Compendium Mariologiae, Roschini explained that Mary did not only participate in the birth of the physical Jesus, but, with conception, she entered with him into a spiritual union. The divine salvation plan, being not only material, includes a permanent spiritual unity with Christ. Most Mariologists agree with this position. 

The title tends to be most popular among conservative Catholics. Modern proponents see some support in Inter sodalica, a 1918 commemorative letter of Pope Benedict XV to a Roman sodality:As the Blessed Virgin Mary does not seem to participate in the public life of Jesus Christ, and then, suddenly appears at the stations of his cross, she is not there without divine intention. She suffers with her suffering and dying son, almost as if she would have died herself. For the salvation of mankind, she gave up her rights as the mother of her son and, in a sense, offered Christ's sacrifice to God the Father as far as she was permitted to do. Therefore, one can say, she redeemed with Christ the human race. 

Theologians distinguish between "remote cooperation", by which she consents to the Incarnation and gives birth to the Son of God, and "immediate cooperation", in which she willingly unites herself to her Son's Passion and offers him back to the Father. Philosophers also draw a distinction between merit de condigno (Christ's merit), which is based on justice, and merit proprie de congruo (Mary's merit), founded on the friendship of charity. In his encyclical on the Immaculate Conception, Ad diem illum, Pope Pius X said, "...since Mary carries it over all in holiness and union with Jesus Christ, and has been associated by Jesus Christ in the work of redemption, she merits for us de congruo, in the language of theologians, what Jesus Christ merits for us de condigno." 

Attempts to promote a fifth marian dogma undertaken in the 20s-40s of the twentieth century did not come to fruition due to Pope Pius XII's veto. The term was not used in the concluding chapter of the apostolic constitution Lumen gentium of the Second Vatican Council, which chapter many theologians hold to be a comprehensive summary of Roman Catholic Mariology.  Some, in particular the adherents of the Amsterdam visions, have petitioned for a dogmatic definition, along with Mediatrix, but recent high-level comments in the church have not encouraged these hopes.

On April 7, 2017, the Congregation of the Mother Coredemptrix was renamed to the Congregation of the Mother of the Redeemer upon the recommendation of the Congregation for the Evangelization of Peoples, due to the "theological ambiguity" of the title Coredemptrix.

On two occasions - in December 2019 and March 2021 - Pope Francis has spoken out against the use of the term. At a Mass in the chapel of the Casa Santa Marta on April 3, 2020 Francis said: "She did not ask herself to be a quasi-redeemer or a co-redeemer: no. The Redeemer is one and this title does not double."

Context
The concept of Mary offering Christ's sufferings is theologically complex. Christ offered himself alone; “the Passion of Christ did not need any assistance.” It is according to the spirit of the offertory or preparation of the gifts within the Mass to prepare to offer oneself with Christ as a part of the Eucharistic Prayer, being members of his mystical body, acknowledging that not even the greatest effort, of itself and apart from Christ, can be of any significance to God. A priest participates in the Eucharistic Celebration as an icon of Christ.

Mary “merits for us de congruo”, i.e. by way of a fitting reward not binding upon God, “what Jesus Christ merits for us de condigno”, i.e. by God binding himself to give the reward. It is uncertain whether Pope Pius X meant "for us” to mean all humankind except Christ's human nature and Mary, or only those living after Mary's merits, since the former could potentially break the general rule that the effect comes after the cause. Where it concerns post-Assumption graces, it is a pious opinion that the entirety of them come through the "intercession" of Mary, a concept that is in itself in need of clarification.

Proponents view the title Co-Redemptrix as not implying that Mary participates as equal part in the redemption of the human race, since Christ is the only redeemer.  Mary herself needed redemption and was redeemed by Jesus Christ. Being redeemed by Christ, implies that she cannot be his equal part in the redemption process. Similarly, if Mary is described as the mediatrix of all graces, it “is to be so understood that it neither takes away from nor adds anything to the dignity and efficaciousness of Christ the one Mediator”.

This whole topic is made more complex by the evolving understanding of what "sacrifice" means in the Catholic Church, whether it is propitiatory or expiatory.

Proposed dogmatic definition
There have been efforts to propose a formal dogmatization, which has had both popular and ecclesiastical support. The proposal for the dogma is often associated with the alleged apparitions of The Lady of All Nations to Ida Peerdeman, in Amsterdam, Netherlands. The visionary reported that the Lady of the apparition repeatedly instructed her to petition Pope Pius XII to dogmatically define Mary's spiritual motherhood under the threefold title of Coredemptrix, Mediatrix, and Advocate. The apparitions have the approval of the diocesan ordinary, Bishop Jozef Marianus Punt of Haarlem-Amsterdam. This came after the Congregation for the Doctrine of the Faith had affirmed the earlier finding of Bishop Johannes Huibers, a predecessor, that he "found no evidence of the supernatural nature of the apparitions". The CDF affirmed his position on 13 March 1957 and again on 24 May 1972 and 25 May 1974.

The possibility of such a dogma was brought up at the Second Vatican Council by Italian, Spanish, and Polish bishops, but not dealt with on the council floor. Subsequently, "not only did the Council not take the route of a dogmatic pronouncement, but it positively avoided using 'coredemptio'", and popes pointedly did not include such language in their encyclicals.

In the early 1990s Mark Miravalle of the Franciscan University of Steubenville and author of the book Mary: Coredemptrix, Mediatrix, Advocate launched a popular petition to urge Pope John Paul II to declare Mary Coredemptrix ex cathedra. Salvatore Perrella of the Pontifical Theological Faculty of the Marianum in Rome thought that this indicated "...a certain 'under-appreciation' of the Council's teaching, which is perhaps believed to be not completely adequate to illustrate comprehensively Mary's co-operation in Christ's work of Redemption."

Scriptural basis
The New Testament is commonly cited in favour of this teaching:

: "Now there stood by the cross of Jesus, his mother, and his mother's sister, Mary of Cleophas, and Mary Magdalen. When Jesus therefore had seen his mother and the disciple standing whom he loved, he saith to his mother: Woman, behold thy son. After that, he saith to the disciple: Behold thy mother. And from that hour, the disciple took her to his own." Lumen gentium, the Dogmatic Constitution on the Church, states, "...In this singular way she cooperated by her obedience, faith, hope and burning charity in the work of the Saviour in giving back supernatural life to souls. Wherefore she is our mother in the order of grace."

:  "[I, Paul,] now rejoice in my sufferings for you, and fill up those things that are wanting of the sufferings of Christ, in my flesh, for his body, which is the church”. 
If Paul could fill up what was behind, so could the Blessed Virgin Mary a fortiori. At the same time, this is easily interpreted as the task of all Christians to mediate the face of Christ to the world.

Opposing arguments
Arguments opposed are that such a dogma might subtract from the redemptive role of Jesus Christ. Faber says,

Faber recognized that the term Co-Redemptrix usually requires some explanation in modern English because so often the prefix co- tends to imply complete equality. He also explains that, "Thus, so far as the literal meaning of the word is concerned, it would appear that the term co-redemptress is not theologically true, or at least does not express the truth it certainly contains with theological accuracy." 

This concern is shared by Perrella.The semantic weight of this expression would require a good many other qualifications and clarifications, especially in the case under examination, where she who is wished to be proclaimed co-redeemer is, in the first place, one who is redeemed, albeit in a singular manner, and who participates in Redemption primarily as something she herself receives. Thus we see the inadequacy of the above-mentioned term for expressing a doctrine which requires, even from the lexical standpoint, the proper nuances and distinctions of levels.

It was rejected by the Vatican in the past because of serious theological difficulties. In August 1996, a Mariological Congress was held in Częstochowa, Poland, where a commission was established in response to a request of the Holy See. The congress sought the opinion of scholars present there regarding the possibility of proposing a fifth Marian dogma on Mary as Coredemptrix, Mediatrix, and Advocate. The commission unanimously declared that it was not opportune, voting 23–0 against the proposed dogma.

Another argument is that it would also complicate ecumenical efforts for a better understanding of the role of the Blessed Virgin Mary in the salvation mystery of Jesus Christ.

By 1998 it was doubtful the Vatican was going to consider new Marian dogmas. The papal spokesman stated "This is not under study by the Holy Father nor by any Vatican congregation or commission." A leading Mariologist stated the petition was "theologically inadequate, historically a mistake, pastorally imprudent and ecumenically unacceptable." Pope John Paul II cautioned against "all false exaggeration"; his teaching and devotion to Mary has strictly been "exalting Mary as the first among believers but concentrating all faith on the Triune God and giving primacy to Christ." In his 1994 Apostolic letter, Tertio Milennio Adveniente, John Paul said, "Christ, the Redeemer of the world, is the one Mediator between God and men, and there is no other name under heaven by which we can be saved (cf. Acts 4:12)." 

When asked in an interview in 2000 whether the Catholic Church would go along with the desire to solemnly define Mary as Co-redemptrix, then-Cardinal Ratzinger (later Pope Benedict XVI) responded that, "...the formula “Co-redemptrix” departs to too great an extent from the language of Scripture and of the Fathers and therefore gives rise to misunderstandings. ...Everything comes from Him [Christ], as the Letter to the Ephesians and the Letter to the Colossians, in particular, tell us; Mary, too, is everything she is through Him. The word “Co-redemptrix” would obscure this origin. A correct intention being expressed in the wrong way.

In December 2019, at a Mass in St. Peter's Basilica celebrating the feast of Our Lady of Guadalupe, Pope Francis said in referring to a picture of La Morenita that three terms came to mind, woman, mother and mestiza; the latter because "Mary makes God a mestizo, true God but also true man.”  He also discouraged proposals for a new dogmatic title. "“When they come to us with the story of declaring her this or making that dogma, let’s not get lost in foolishness [in Spanish, tonteras],” he said." 

René Laurentin, theologian specializing in Mariology, said "“There is no mediation or co-redemption except in Christ. He alone is God.”

References
 Ludwig Ott, Fundamentals of Catholic Dogma, Mercier Press Ltd., Cork, Ireland, 1955.
 Acta Apostolicae Sedis, referenced as AAS by year.

Notes 

Catholic Mariology
Titles of Mary